Jerzy Konikowski (born 24 January 1947, in Bytom, Poland) is a Polish–German chess master, problemist and author.

He was a Polish national team trainer in 1978–1981 (the Polish Women's national team won bronze medal in the 9th Women's Chess Olympiad at La Valletta 1980). In 1981, he emigrated to West Germany. Since 1982, he worked at the Dortmund University of Technology as a chemist. In Germany he trained many young players, among others – Arkadij Naiditsch.

His name is attached to the Konikowski-Hardy Gambit in the Ruy Lopez, Cordel Defence (1.e4 e5 2.Nf3 Nc6 3.Bb5 Bc5 4.c3 d5!?).

Awarded the FIDE Master title in 1983.

References

External links
 Home Page of Jerzy Konikowski
 Blog of Jerzy Konikowski

 Chessgames.com
 Chess problems

1947 births
Living people
Polish chess players
German chess players
Chess composers
Chess coaches
Chess FIDE Masters
Chess theoreticians
Sportspeople from Bytom